Lorain County Community College (LCCC) is a public community college in the city of Elyria in Lorain County, Ohio, with learning centers in Wellington, North Ridgeville, and Lorain. In addition to associate degrees and certificates, students can earn bachelor's and master's degrees on campus through the college's partnerships with universities.

History

Lorain County Community College was the first community college in Ohio to have a permanent campus, located at 1005 North Abbe Road, Elyria, Ohio. The college was founded on July 15, 1963.

President Barack Obama visited the campus in January 2010 and April 2012.

Its fifth president, Marcia Ballinger, was inaugurated on July 1, 2016.

In 2018, the college was recognized by the American Association of Community Colleges (AACC) as the 2018 Recipient of the AACC Award of Excellence in Student Success. Two years later, Achieving the Dream awarded the college the 2020 Leah Meyer Austin Award, ATD's national prize reserved for network colleges that show greatest, sustained improvements in student outcomes and student success.

Academics
LCCC operates on a semester system and is accredited by Higher Learning Commission. It offers program and career pathways in arts and humanities; engineering, business and information technologies; health and wellness, science and mathematics; social sciences and human services.

The college offers traditional and online courses for numerous associate programs as well as classes that easily transfer to other colleges and universities. The college was named one of the most affordable community colleges in the nation by the U.S. Department of Education. Students pay the lowest net price of any community college in the state, according to a recent Integrated Post Secondary Education Data Systems survey. LCCC also leads the state in student success with a 61% student success rate versus an average for Ohio Community College of 51% in a report issued by the Ohio Department of Higher Education in January. The college ranks top 50 nationally for highest paid graduates in the 2016-2017 College Salary Report by PayScale Human Capital.

LCCC's Division of Arts and Humanities is home to several distinguished scholars and artists, notably 2013 Pulitzer Prize for Poetry finalist and 2006 Lannan Literary Award-winning poet and memoirist Bruce Weigl and composer Jeffrey Mumford, 2013 composer-in-residence at the National Gallery of Art.  Marilyn Valentino, professor emeritus of English, served as national chair of the Conference on College Composition and Communication in 2010.

The college was the first community college in Ohio to offer an applied bachelor's degree in micro-electrical mechanical systems (MEMS). The MEMS program prepares students for entry into a career after completing hands-on paid internships. LCCC is also currently the only community college in Ohio to offer a MEMS associate degree program.

LCCC was the first community college to exhibit a fabrication lab, the "Fab Lab", on its campus. As a Massachusetts Institute of Technology project in 2005, it was the second public facility in the country with the equipment. This technology allows students and the community first-hand experience with a very technical and economical skill. The new Campana Center for Ideation and Invention, which houses the “Fab Lab,” allows students and community members to utilize cutting-edge digital and additive manufacturing labs, interaction collaboration space and hands-on education programs.

University Partnership
LCCC's University Partnership program offers more than 50 bachelor's and master's degrees from 14 Ohio universities to LCCC students through coursework taught on LCCC's campus by university partner instructors. Students receive degrees from their partner institutions with the benefit of paying part of their tuition at community college rates. LCCC was the first community college in Ohio to have such a program, which began in 1996. Many classes are held in the LCCC University Center building, a facility designed specifically for students enrolled in University Partnership degree programs. Other courses are also held at the University Partnership Ridge Campus in North Ridgeville.

Locations
LCCC has four learning centers in other areas of Lorain County. Two learning centers in the city of Lorain at Lorain High School and at City Center provide students with basic general education requirements. Students can also work toward STNA or medical assisting degrees at LHS and take College Credit Plus courses. The University Partnership Ridge Campus in North Ridgeville offers University Partnership courses as well as general education classes. The University of Toledo's computer science and engineering bachelor of science program, housed at UPRC, was recently ranked as one of the top four engineering programs in the state of Ohio by the Princeton Review. Additionally, the UPRC-based Northeast Ohio Forensic Data Recovery provides Digital Forensics services to various government agencies and private companies. The Wellington Learning Center also allows students in the southern part of Lorain County a chance to take LCCC courses in their local community.

Student life
The average age of an LCCC degree-seeking student is 26; 62 percent are women; 72 percent are enrolled in programs that provide them with skills for immediate employment; and 28 percent are enrolled in programs that lead to transfer into bachelor's degree programs. High school students can take part in the College Credit Plus program which allows them to complete LCCC courses while earning their high school diplomas and associate degree at the same time. This program is available throughout the state of Ohio and is Ohio's form of duel-enrollment. The Early College High School is available to certain first-generation college students to take high school and associate degree credentials on campus.

Students can take part in several clubs, organizations or the student senate. Varsity sports include: women's volleyball, men's and women's cross country, women's basketball, men's basketball, women's fastpitch softball and men's baseball. The LCCC's men's basketball team won the Regional Championship in 2017. Club sports include co-ed tennis, women's soccer and men's soccer. The on-campus Stocker Arts Center opened its doors in 1980 to offer the visual and performing arts, as well as film, to the community.

References

External links
 Official website

Community colleges in Ohio
Education in Lorain County, Ohio
Elyria, Ohio
Buildings and structures in Lorain County, Ohio
NJCAA athletics